On November 3, 2021, Grodno Aviakompania Flight 1252, an Antonov An-12BK registered EW-518TI crashed during an attempt to go-around, killing all nine people (seven crew members and two passengers) on board. This was the first fatal accident for Grodno Aviakompania.

Flight 
The aircraft was an Antonov An-12BK. It was scheduled to leave from Yakutsk carrying edible items and other consumer goods. Radar contact with the flight was lost at 19:45 local time. The aircraft crashed south-eastwards of Runway 30 and burst into flames. All nine people aboard were killed.

References

External links
 Interstate Aviation Committee English investigation page and Russian investigation page

November 2021 events in Russia
Accidents and incidents involving the Antonov An-12
Aviation accidents and incidents in 2021
Aviation accidents and incidents in Russia
2021 disasters in Russia